The M. K. Čiurlionis National Art Museum is a group of museums based in Kaunas, Lithuania. It is primarily dedicated to exhibiting and publicizing the works of the painter and musician M.K. Čiurlionis (1875–1911).

The museum was founded in 1921, and opened a temporary gallery in 1925. It was renamed Vytautas the Great Museum of Culture in 1936, receiving its current name in 1944. An expansion took place in 1969. The interwar part of the building was built in Art Deco and early functionalism style.

The museum sponsors international exhibitions along with lectures, concerts, conferences, and special educational activities for children.

The museum shares its building with the Vytautas the Great War Museum and is located in the New Town of Kaunas. The oldest still functioning Žaliakalnis Funicular Railway is situated nearby. It climbs  up from behind the M. K. Čiurlionis National Art Museum to the Church of the Resurrection.

In 2015, the building was one of 44 objects in Kaunas to receive the European Heritage Label.

Exhibition
M.K.Ciurlionis Art Museum in Kaunas has more than 355,000 items. The museum’s exhibit collections consist of M.K.Ciurlionis’ heritage, Lithuanian folk art, fine and applied arts of Lithuania of the fifteenth-twentieth centuries, ancient world art, foreign fine and applied art, numismatics, archives of folk art and the artistic life items of Lithuania. 

Branches of the M. K. Čiurlionis National Art Museum include:
 the Mykolas Žilinskas Art Gallery
 Kaunas Picture Gallery
 Kaunas Historical Presidential Palace
 Ceramics Museum
 Devils' Museum
 M. K. Čiurlionis Memorial Museum
 Antanas Žmuidzinavičius Memorial Museum
 Paulius Galaunė Family House
  Liudas Truikys and Marijona Rakauskaite Museum
 Juozas Zikaras Museum 
 Vytautas Kazimieras Jonynas Gallery.

Gallery

References

External links

Website of the M. K. Čiurlionis National Art Museum

Art museums and galleries in Lithuania
1921 establishments in Lithuania
Art museums established in 1921
Museums in Kaunas